Bunker's woodrat (Neotoma bryanti bunkeri) is an extinct subspecies of Bryant's woodrat in the family Cricetidae. Only five specimens are known; these were collected in 1932 by W.H. Burt and are housed at a museum at UCLA.  Neotoma bunkeri was only described from Coronados Islands, Baja California, Mexico. It probably died out as a result of depletion of food resources and predation by feral cats.

References

Musser, G. G. and M. D. Carleton. 2005. Superfamily Muroidea. pp. 894–1531 in Mammal Species of the World a Taxonomic and Geographic Reference. D. E. Wilson and D. M. Reeder eds. Johns Hopkins University Press, Baltimore.

Neotoma
Mammals described in 1932
Taxonomy articles created by Polbot